Gidroagregat, formerly Pavlovo Kadyshev Mechanical Plant, is a company based in Pavlovo, Russia. In 2017 the company had revenues of 4.8 billion rubles ($ million).

The Pavlovo Kadyshev Mechanical Plant specializes in the series manufacture of hydraulic drive units and control systems for airplanes, helicopters, distribution mechanisms and devices, high-speed DC motors, gas batteries and cylinders and other equipment.

References

External links
 Official website

Manufacturing companies of Russia
Companies based in Nizhny Novgorod Oblast
Aerospace companies of Russia
Aerospace companies of the Soviet Union
Ministry of the Aviation Industry (Soviet Union)
Aircraft component manufacturers of the Soviet Union